The social environment, social context, sociocultural context or milieu refers to the immediate physical and social setting in which people live or in which something happens or develops. It includes the culture that the individual was educated or lives in, and the people and institutions with whom they interact. The interaction may be in person or through communication media, even anonymous or one-way, and may not imply equality of social status. The social environment is a broader concept than that of social class or social circle.

The physical and social environment is a determining factor in active and healthy aging in place, being a central factor in the study of environmental gerontology.

Solidarity

People with the same social environment often develop a sense of social solidarity; people often tend to trust and help one another, and to congregate in social groups.  They will often think in similar styles and patterns, even though the conclusions which they reach may differ.

Natural/artificial environment

In order to enrich their lives, people have used natural resources, and in the process have brought about many changes in the natural environment. Human settlements, roads, farmlands, dams, and many other elements have all developed through the process. All these man-made components are included in human cultural environment, Erving Goffman in particular emphasising the deeply social nature of the individual environment.

Milieu/social structure

C. Wright Mills contrasted the immediate milieu of jobs/family/neighborhood with the wider formations of the social structure, highlighting in particular a distinction between "the personal troubles of milieu" and the "public crises of social structure".

Emile Durkheim took a wider view of the social environment (milieu social), arguing that it contained internalized expectations and representations of social forces/social facts: "Our whole social environment seems to be filled with forces which really exist only in our own minds" – collective representations.

Phenomenology

Phenomenologists contrast two alternative visions of society, as a deterministic constraint (milieu) and as a nurturing shell (ambiance).

Max Scheler distinguishes between milieu as an experienced value-world, and the objective social environment on which we draw to create the former, noting that the social environment can either foster or restrain our creation of a personal milieu.

Social surgery

Pierre Janet saw neurosis in part as the product of the identified patient's social environment – family, social network, work etc. – and considered that in some instances what he termed "social surgery" to create a healthier environment could be a beneficial measure.

Similar ideas have since been taken up in community psychiatry and family therapy.

See also

 Alfred Schütz – The four divisions of the lifeworld
 Communitarianism
 Community of practice
 Family nexus
 Framing (social sciences)
 Generalized other
 Microculture
 Milieu control
 Milieu therapy
 Pillarisation

References

Further reading
 Leo Spitzer, "Milieu and Ambience: An Essay in Historical Semantics", in Philosophy and Phenomenological Research III (1942-3)
 James Morrow, Where the Everyday Begins. A Study of Environment and Everyday Life. transcript, Bielefeld 2017, .

Sociological terminology
Personal life